In computing, Code generation denotes software techniques or systems that generate program code which may then be used independently of the generator system in a runtime environment.
Specific articles:
 Code generation (compiler), a mechanism to produce the executable form of computer programs, such as machine code, in some automatic manner
 Automatic programming (source code generation), the act of generating source code based on an ontological model such as a template
 Generating code at run time in self-modifying code and just-in-time compilation
 Model-driven development uses graphical models and metamodels as basis for generating programs
 Program synthesis consists of synthesizing programs from a high-level, typically declarative specification
 Random test generators are used in functional verification of microprocessors
 Comparison of code generation tools shows the diversity of tools and approaches for code generation